Steven Charles Witkoff (born March 15, 1957) is an American real estate investor and landlord based in New York City, and founder of the Witkoff Group.

Early life and education
Witkoff was born to a Jewish family in the Bronx and raised in Baldwin Harbor, New York and Old Westbury, New York, the son of Martin and Lois Witkoff. His father was a manufacturer of ladies' coats in New York City. He earned a J.D. from Hofstra University. After school he worked for the real estate law firm Dreyer & Traub, where one of his clients was Donald Trump.

Career
In 1985, he partnered with fellow Dreyer & Traub attorney Laurence Gluck and founded Stellar Management (the name Stellar is derived from Steve and Larry) and purchased cheap buildings in Washington Heights, Manhattan. He accumulated a small portfolio of buildings and in 1995, he expanded into lower Manhattan, buying several cheap office buildings. In 1996, he was able to secure financing from Credit Suisse First Boston for the purchase of 33 Maiden Lane, a 27-story tower designed by Philip Johnson. A close relationship with Credit Suisse First Boston soon developed and Witkoff was able to purchase additional properties - typically using very little of his own money - including the landmark News Building.

In 1998, he and partner Rubin Schron purchased the Woolworth Building for $137.5 million and he expanded his portfolio to include real estate purchases in Chicago, Dallas and Philadelphia. In 1998, the planned IPO of his company was cancelled due to the collapse of the real estate market and Witkoff and Gluck dissolved their partnership with Gluck taking the residential properties and Witkoff the office buildings. Witkoff founded the Witkoff Group and expanded into residential construction and rehab.

As of 2013, Witkoff owns about 30 properties in the United States and London. In November 2013, the Witkoff Group announced their purchase of the Helmsley Park Lane Hotel (New York).

In August 2017, Witkoff purchased the unfinished Fontainebleau Resort Las Vegas in Las Vegas.

In February 2018, Witkoff announced the former Fontainebleau will be developed and open in 2020 as The Drew Las Vegas, named after Witkoff's son, Andrew (nicknamed "Drew"), who died of a drug overdose in 2011. The Drew Las Vegas will open in partnership with Marriott International Inc., and will be the first JW Marriott on the Las Vegas Strip.

In April 2019, Witkoff announced that the Drew's opening will be pushed back to the second quarter of 2022 to allow more certainty about his construction project. The property was previously scheduled to open in late 2020.

Personal life
Witkoff lives on the Upper East Side in Manhattan. In 1987, he married Lauren Rappoport. They have three sons. In 2011, their son Andrew died of an OxyContin overdose at the now-closed Sunset Plaza Drive sober living facility in California.

References

1957 births
American real estate businesspeople
20th-century American Jews
Businesspeople from New York City
People from the Bronx
Maurice A. Deane School of Law alumni
Living people
People from Hempstead (town), New York
People from Old Westbury, New York
People from the Upper East Side
American landlords
21st-century American Jews